Brachypodosaurus (meaning "short-footed lizard") is a dubious genus of dinosaur, possibly an ornithischian, from the Late Cretaceous Lameta Formation (Maastrichtian) in India.

The only remains discovered so far for this animal consist of a single fossil bone, excavated at the Chota Simla Hill near Jabalpur. In 1934, geologist Dhirendra Kishore Chakravarti, of the Geological Museum of the Banaras Hindu University, considered it a humerus, of a stegosaurian. He named it as the type species Brachypodosaurus gravis. The generic name is derived from Greek βραχύς, brachys, "short", and πούς, pous, "foot". The specific name gravis means "heavy" in Latin. Chakravarti hereby became the first local scientist to name a dinosaur.

The holotype is IM V9. The bone is over a foot long. Chakravarti based his identification of the element as a humerus on the presence of a large crest on the shaft, which he took for the deltopectoral crest. The status as a (dinosaurian) humerus is problematic. The bone is flat, has a crest on the other side of the shaft also, is not twisted around its longitudinal axis, is strongly constricted above and below the crests and lacks a clear caput or condyles. In any case, it lacks stegosaurian synapomorphies. On the assumption it might at least be some member of the Thyreophora, it has been considered a possible ankylosaurian, the ankylosaurs being a sister group of the Stegosauria that survived into the Late Cretaceous. Even then, however, it was considered a nomen dubium as so few remains of the animal have been found. In 2004, Matthew Lamanna e.a. considered it unlikely that any Ornithischia were present in the Maastrichtian of India. The other Late Cretaceous genus from India originally described as a stegosaur, Dravidosaurus, is also of dubious validity, potentially based on plesiosaurian remains.

References 

Thyreophorans
Late Cretaceous dinosaurs
Dinosaurs of India and Madagascar
Maastrichtian life
Fossils of India
Fossil taxa described in 1934
Nomina dubia